WBNK (92.7 MHz) is an FM Contemporary Christian radio station located in Pine Knoll Shores, North Carolina and serving the New Bern/Morehead City region of Coastal North Carolina.

Before Lanser Broadcasting agreed to buy WBNK for $275,000 in 2015, it was an affiliate of the Christian Hit Radio Satellite Network (CHRSN).

On December 24, 2015, after being silent since its sale, the station returned to the air as 92.7 The Beacon, a Christian contemporary format, adding a local morning show.

In March 2018, the station was sold to the Educational Media Foundation for $100,000, and the station affiliated with its Christian music network K-Love. EMF's acquisition of WBNK was consummated on June 22, 2018.

References

External links
 

New Bern, North Carolina
K-Love radio stations
Educational Media Foundation radio stations
Contemporary Christian radio stations in the United States
BNK